The Jianyang railway station is a railway station of Chengdu–Chongqing Railway. The station is located in Jianyang, Ziyang, Sichuan, China.

See also
Chengdu–Chongqing Railway

Stations on the Chengdu–Chongqing Railway
Railway stations in Sichuan
Railway stations in China opened in 1953